Hen'badhoo School, formerly Hen'badhoo Makuthab, is a Northern Region community school on Hen'badhoo Atoll in the Maldives which opened in 1993. The school was housed in an older building, and when the new building was completed, the name of the school was changed and all activities transferred to the new building. The school has mostly temporary teachers and three primary teachers. Some expatriate teachers are now working in the school too. The school has almost 150 students. Starting in 2007, grades up to the 8th standard will be taught at Hen'badhoo School.

References

External links
 Province Website
 Hen'badhoo on Google Maps

Educational institutions established in 1993
Schools in the Maldives
1993 establishments in the Maldives